Patriot (Russian: ЧВК «Патриот») is a Russian Private Military and Security Company (PMSC), which is in direct competition with Yevgeny Prigozhin's Wagner Group and deployed by Russia in the Russian invasion of Ukraine.

Organisation 
Patriot operates in close cooperation with the Russian Ministry of Defence and the Military Intelligence Service (GRU). Russian Defence Minister Sergei Shoigu is believed to have strong influence over the company.

Unlike the Wagner Group, Patriot focuses more on experienced soldiers with combat experience when recruiting. The mercenaries are also better equipped and trained. According to media reports, Patriot's members receive a monthly salary of 6,300 to 15,800 US dollars.

Deployment areas 

 Syria: According to several media reports, members of the military company have been active in Syria since the spring of 2018. Unlike the Wagner group, Patriot mercenaries are said to be more active in personal protection. 

 Ukraine: In the wake of the Russian war of aggression against Ukraine, Russia is believed to be deploying the mercenary Patriot group, as well as the Wagner Group, in the Donbas. A spokesman for the Ukrainian Armed Forces reported that soldiers of the company were spotted during the Battle of Vuhledar.

 Yemen: In the wake of the Emirati involvement in the Yemeni civil war, the UAE has turned to non-western sources against the Turkish & Qatari backed-Yemeni Muslim Brotherhood. The UAE has hired Patriot to support Yemeni Separatist forces.

 Central African Republic: Patriot applied as a private security company to protect gold mines in the Central African Republic. However, the contract was awarded to the Wagner group. According to the Doschd television station, the mercenary group was also involved in the murder of three journalists investigating secret Russian arms shipments to the African country.

See also 

 List of private security and military companies
 Russian invasion of Ukraine 2022
 Redut (PMC)
 Wagner Group

References

Private military contractors
Paramilitary organizations based in Russia
Russian mercenaries
Military units and formations of the 2022 Russian invasion of Ukraine